André Charpak (4 September 1928 – 23 June 2006) was a Polish-born French actor, dialoguist, film director and screenwriter. A brother of the physicist Georges Charpak he was an alumnus of the prestigious Lycée Henri-IV where he earned his Baccalauréat.

Filmography 
Director and screenwriter
 1964: Mayeux le bossu (short film) with Jacques Dufilho
 1964 : La Vie normale
 1967: Le Crime de David Levinstein
 1970: La Provocation
 1973: William Conrad (téléfilm) with Pierre Boulle

Actor
 1958 : En bordée by Pierre Chevalier
 1961: Sur la Piste... (Les Cinq Dernières Minutes, n°19), by Claude Loursais
 1962: Paludi (telefilm)
 1965: La Dame de pique by Léonard Keigel
 1967 : Le Crime de David Levinstein
 1970 : La Provocation with Jean Marais
 1973 : William Conrad (telefilm) 
 1973 : Le Feu sous la neige (telefilm)
 1973: Le Drakkar by Jacques Pierre (telefilm)
 1978: Meurtre sur la personne de la mer (telefilm)
 La Première Légion (telefilm)

Theatre 
 1959 : The Gambler after Fyodor Dostoyevsky, mise en scène
 1961 : Life Is a Dream by Pedro Calderón de la Barca, directed by André Charpak
 1963 : Monsieur Vautrin (adaptation of the play by Balzac)
 1963 : Another Man's Wife (by Fyodor Dostoyevsky)

References

External links 
 

1928 births
2006 deaths
French film directors
French people of Polish-Jewish descent
French theatre directors
French male screenwriters
20th-century French screenwriters
French male stage actors
French male television actors
Jewish French male actors
20th-century French male actors
Polish emigrants to France
Lycée Henri-IV alumni
20th-century French male writers